Alexander N. Green (born September 1, 1947) is an American lawyer and politician serving as the U.S. representative from Texas's 9th congressional district since 2005. A member of the Democratic Party, Green served as the justice of the peace of Harris County, Texas from 1977 to 2004. The 9th district includes most of southwestern Houston and part of Fort Bend County, including most of Missouri City.

Early life and early career
Green was born in New Orleans, Louisiana. He attended Florida A&M University and Tuskegee University. He received a Juris Doctor degree in 1974 from Thurgood Marshall School of Law at Texas Southern University. He is a member of Alpha Phi Alpha fraternity.

After law school, Green co-founded the law firm of Green, Wilson, Dewberry, and Fitch. He remained in Houston and lives in the community of Alief.

In 1978, Green was elected justice of the peace in Harris County, Texas. He held this position for 26 years before retiring in 2004.

Green ran for mayor of Houston in 1981, and finished fifth in the Democratic primary.

U.S. House of Representatives

Elections 

In 2004, Green entered the Democratic primary for the 9th congressional district. The 9th district had previously been the 25th congressional district and was represented by Democrat Chris Bell. A 2003 Texas redistricting placed Bell's seat in jeopardy. Although the redistricted 25th district remained heavily Democratic, it had a significantly larger percentage of blacks and Latinos than the old 25th district, which had been 65% white. The new 9th was 17% white, 37% black and 33% Latino. The redistricting left Bell, who is white, vulnerable to a primary challenge from a black or Latino Democrat. Green won the March 9 primary with 66% of the vote to Bell's 31%. He then defeated Republican nominee Annette Molina in the general election.

Green was reelected unopposed in 2006 and faced only a Libertarian opponent in 2008. The 9th district is heavily Democratic, with a Cook Partisan Voting Index of D+29. It is Houston's most Democratic district. Hillary Clinton carried the 9th district in 2016 with 79.3% of the vote, her strongest showing in Texas.

Tenure 
In Congress, Green has focused on issues such as fair housing and fair hiring practices for the poor and minorities.

After the 2012 election, Green held a press conference in Houston at which he emphasized the need for the lame duck Congress to work together to reform the national budget. He also announced a plan for infrastructure investments across the country intended to create jobs and unify the country and improve the economy.

Green has supported the Federal Reserve's program of quantitative easing and claims it has led to economic recovery since the financial crisis of 2007–2008.

On May 17, 2017, Green presented articles of impeachment against President Donald Trump, citing Trump's firing of FBI Director James Comey. Immediately after his speech, he shelved the document without calling for a vote, but continued to call for impeachment. He reintroduced articles of impeachment on July 16, 2019, citing Trump's attacks on four Democratic congresswomen of color. As a privileged resolution, the House was required to vote on it. On July 17 the House voted to table the resolution, effectively killing it. The vote was 332–95, with 95 Democrats (40%) voting in favor of the resolution and all Republicans against it.

During the House Financial Services Committee hearing on April 10, 2019, at which the CEOs of all the major banks and investment institutions of the United States were sworn to testify, Green presented several questions that were regarded as controversial. He began by asking why all the executives were white men, then asked whether they hypothetically saw themselves succeeded in the future by men of color or women, repeatedly asking them to raise and lower their hands. Green then asked J. P. Morgan CEO Jamie Dimon whether the institution he chaired had profited from slavery, to which Dimon responded that it had taken place more than two centuries ago.

Committee assignments
Committee on Financial Services
United States House Financial Services Subcommittee on Oversight and Investigations (Chair)
United States House Financial Services Subcommittee on Financial Institutions and Consumer Credit

Caucus memberships
Congressional Black Caucus
Congressional Asian Pacific American Caucus
Congressional Maritime Caucus
Congressional Urban Caucus
Congressional Azerbaijan Caucus
Congressional Natural Gas Caucus
Congressional Ports Caucus
Congressional Science, Technology, Education and Math (STEM) Caucus
Congressional After School Caucus
Congressional Veterans Jobs Caucus
Congressional Military Family Caucus
Congressional Children's Caucus
Congressional Caucus on India and Indian Americans
Congressional Arts Caucus
Afterschool Caucuses
U.S.-Japan Caucus
Congressional Pakistan Caucus
Medicare for All Caucus

Political positions
Green has expressed strong liberal views on social issues.

Green is pro-choice, and consistently votes against restrictions on abortion. On October 13, 2011, he voted against an amendment to the Affordable Care Act, which prevented insurance programs created by the Act from covering abortions. He has voted against eight other bills proposed in the House that would if enacted prevent the federal government from covering the cost of abortions. He has received a 100% ratings from Planned Parenthood and NARAL Pro-Choice America, while receiving a 0% rating from the National Right to Life Committee.

Green also supports gun control. He spoke out after the Trayvon Martin shooting, asking members of the African-American community to show faith in the justice system and let the courts do their job and convict George Zimmerman. The National Rifle Association gave him a rating of 0%,  Gun Owners of America rated him 25%, while the Brady Campaign to Prevent Gun Violence gave him a Lifetime Score of 83%.

On budget issues, Green follows his party's views. He supported every budget bill proposed during President Obama's term. During President Bush's term, Green voted against all budget bills that cut government spending and cut taxes. He also voted for Obama's bailout of the Auto Industry in 2009. On December 10, 2008, he wrote a statement supporting the auto bailout, saying, "The auto bailout is really about bailing out people, and the people of this country... I think that [how tax dollars are spent] is a legitimate concern for the American people, but I do think, with the proper strings attached, we can bail out the people...who may lose their jobs."

Green is a member of the Congressional Pakistan Caucus. He is a strong supporter of holding Pakistan as an ally in South Asia.  After the assassination of former Prime Minister Benazir Bhutto on December 27, 2007, which initially destabilized the country as riots erupted, Green issued a statement condemning the assassination as a "dastardly effort to circumvent the democratic process."  He announced his support of the US's continued alliance with Pakistan, and urged Pakistanis to continue their push towards true democracy, "knowing that freedom, justice, and democracy are difficult to achieve."

On December 6, 2017, Green denounced Trump for "casting contempt on transgender individuals, inciting hate and hostility, and sowing discord among the people of the United States on the basis of gender." Green is a member of the Congressional LGBT Equality Caucus. On February 25, 2021, Green gave an impassioned speech on the floor of the House in support of the Equality Act, comparing the use of religion to support homophobia by representatives opposed to the bill to the use of religion to support racist policies, saying, "You used God to enslave my foreparents. You used God to segregate me in schools. You used God to put me in the back of the bus. Have you no shame?"

Lucinda Daniels controversy
In 2008, former staffer Lucinda Daniels accused Green of sexual harassment and discrimination in the workplace, including claims that Green discriminated against Daniels after she refused to continue to have sex with him. Daniels filed a lawsuit against Green and then withdrew it. Green filed a counter-lawsuit, alleging Daniels had threatened to sue Green for workplace discrimination if Green did not pay her money. Green subsequently withdrew his suit too. The Hill reported that a spokesman for Green said the two had had a "romantic encounter" in 2007, but that the allegations of sexual harassment were untrue.

In 2017, at a time when several other congressmen were facing accusations of sexual misconduct, Green and Daniels released a joint statement saying that both regretted having "hastily made allegations and charges against one another that have been absolutely resolved" and that they were "friends".

See also
List of African-American United States representatives

References

External links

Congressman Al Green official U.S. House website
Al Green for Congress

|-

1947 births
21st-century American politicians
African-American lawyers
African-American members of the United States House of Representatives
African-American people in Texas politics
American justices of the peace
Articles containing video clips
Democratic Party members of the United States House of Representatives from Texas
American LGBT rights activists
Living people
People from Houston
Texas lawyers
Texas Southern University alumni
Thurgood Marshall School of Law alumni
Tuskegee University alumni
American gun control activists
21st-century African-American politicians
20th-century African-American people